Constituencies of the Bahamas are the electoral divisions for the Bahamas House of Assembly, the lower Parliamentary house. The Assembly currently has 39 single-member constituencies and uses the Westminster first past the post system. The Members of Parliament (MPs) serve 5-year-terms. The last election was in 2021.

List of constituencies

Boundary reviews
The Constituencies Commission conducts a review of the electoral boundaries every 5 years and makes recommendations to ensure that there is parity of numbers in each constituency.

The 2021 report found that three constituencies have over 6 thousand registered voters, whilst five have under 5,000. The Commission suggests that each constituency have around 5,000 voters with a margin of 500.

See also
List of speakers of the House of Assembly of the Bahamas
Local government in The Bahamas

Notes

References

Bahamas, constituencies of the
Bahamas politics-related lists
 
Bahamas, the